Miao Lijie (苗立杰, born June 3, 1981 in Harbin, Heilongjiang) is a female Chinese basketball player who was part of the team that won the gold medal at the 2001 Asian Championship. In 2005, she joined the Sacramento Monarchs of WNBA but left the team after a short time. She competed at the 2004 Summer Olympics, the 2008 Summer Olympics in Beijing and the 2012 Summer Olympics.

References

External links
Miao Lijie

1981 births
Living people
Basketball players at the 2004 Summer Olympics
Basketball players at the 2008 Summer Olympics
Basketball players at the 2012 Summer Olympics
Olympic basketball players of China
Basketball players from Harbin
Chinese women's basketball players
Asian Games medalists in basketball
Basketball players at the 1998 Asian Games
Basketball players at the 2002 Asian Games
Basketball players at the 2006 Asian Games
Basketball players at the 2010 Asian Games
Sacramento Monarchs players
Asian Games gold medalists for China
Asian Games silver medalists for China
Medalists at the 1998 Asian Games
Medalists at the 2002 Asian Games
Medalists at the 2006 Asian Games
Medalists at the 2010 Asian Games
Shenyang Army Golden Lions players
Heilongjiang Dragons players
Chinese women's basketball coaches